The Major League Baseball Most Valuable Player Award (MVP) is an annual Major League Baseball (MLB) award given to one outstanding player in the American League and one in the National League. Since 1931, it has been awarded by the Baseball Writers' Association of America (BBWAA). Until 2020, the winners received the Kenesaw Mountain Landis Memorial Baseball Award, which became the official name of the award in 1944, in honor of the first MLB commissioner, Kenesaw Mountain Landis, who served from 1920 until his death on November 25, 1944. Starting in 2020, Landis’ name no longer appeared on the MVP trophy after the BBWAA received complaints from several former MVP winners about the late Commissioner’s role against integration of MLB.

MVP voting takes place before the postseason, but the results are not announced until after the World Series. The BBWAA began by polling three writers in each league city in 1938, reducing that number to two per league city in 1961. The BBWAA does not offer a clear-cut definition of what "most valuable" means, instead leaving the judgment to the individual voters.

First basemen, with 35 winners, have won the most MVPs among infielders, followed by second basemen (16), third basemen (15), and shortstops (15). Of the 25 pitchers who have won the award, 15 are right-handed while 10 are left-handed. Walter Johnson, Carl Hubbell, and Hal Newhouser are the only pitchers who have won multiple times, with Newhouser winning consecutively in 1944 and 1945.

Hank Greenberg, Stan Musial, Alex Rodriguez, and Robin Yount have won at different positions, while Rodriguez is the only player who has won the award with two different teams at two different positions. Rodriguez and Andre Dawson are the only players to win the award while on a last-place team, the 2003 Texas Rangers and 1987 Chicago Cubs, respectively. Barry Bonds has won the most often (seven times) and the most consecutively (four from 2001–04). Jimmie Foxx was the first player to win multiple times – 10 players have won three times, and 19 have won twice. Frank Robinson is the only player to win the award in both the American and National Leagues.

The award's only tie occurred in the National League in 1979, when Keith Hernandez and Willie Stargell received an equal number of points. There have been 19 unanimous winners, who received all the first-place votes. The New York Yankees have the most winning players with 23, followed by the St. Louis Cardinals with 21 winners. The award has never been presented to a member of the following three teams: Arizona Diamondbacks, New York Mets, and Tampa Bay Rays.

In recent decades, pitchers have rarely won the award. When Shohei Ohtani won the AL award in 2021, he became the first pitcher in either league to be named the MVP since Clayton Kershaw in 2014, and the first in the American League since Justin Verlander in 2011. Ohtani also became the first two-way player to win this award. Since the creation of the Cy Young Award in 1956, he is the only pitcher to win an MVP award without winning a Cy Young in the same year (Don Newcombe, Sandy Koufax, Bob Gibson, Denny McLain, Vida Blue, Rollie Fingers, Willie Hernández, Roger Clemens, Dennis Eckersley, Justin Verlander, and Clayton Kershaw all won a Cy Young award in their MVP seasons).

Key

Chalmers Award (1911–1914)

Before the 1910 season, Hugh Chalmers of Chalmers Automobile announced he would present a Chalmers Model 30 automobile to the player with the highest batting average in Major League Baseball at the end of the season. The 1910 race for best average in the American League was between the Detroit Tigers' widely disliked Ty Cobb and Nap Lajoie of the Cleveland Indians. On the last day of the season, Lajoie overtook Cobb's batting average with seven bunt hits against the St. Louis Browns. American League President Ban Johnson said a recalculation showed that Cobb had won the race anyway, and Chalmers ended up awarding cars to both players.

In the following season, Chalmers created the Chalmers Award. A committee of baseball writers was to convene after the season to determine the "most important and useful player to the club and the league". Since the award was not as effective at advertising as Chalmers had hoped, it was discontinued after 1914.

League Awards (1922–1929)

In 1922 the American League created a new award to honor "the baseball player who is of the greatest all-around service to his club". Winners, voted on by a committee of eight baseball writers chaired by James Crusinberry, received a bronze medal and a cash prize. Voters were required to select one player from each team and player-coaches and prior award winners were ineligible. Famously, these criteria resulted in Babe Ruth winning only a single MVP award before it was dropped after 1928. The National League award, without these restrictions, lasted from 1924 to 1929.

Baseball Writers' Association of America's Most Valuable Player (1931–present)
The BBWAA was first awarded the modern MVP after the 1931 season, adopting the format the National League used to distribute its league award. One writer in each city with a team filled out a ten-place ballot, with ten points for the recipient of a first-place vote, nine for a second-place vote, and so on. In 1938, the BBWAA raised the number of voters to three per city and gave 14 points for a first-place vote. The only significant change since then occurred in 1961 when the number of voters was reduced to two per league city.

Wins by team

See also
"Esurance MLB Awards" Best Major Leaguer (in MLB; all positions) (there are also Best Hitter and Best Pitcher awards (in MLB))
"Players Choice Awards" Player of the Year (in MLB; all positions) (there are also Outstanding Player and Outstanding Pitcher awards (in each league))
Baseball America Major League Player of the Year (in MLB; all positions)
Baseball Digest Player of the Year (in MLB; position players only; from 1969 to 1993, included all positions; in 1994, a separate Pitcher of the Year award was added)
Best Major League Baseball Player ESPY Award (in MLB; all positions)
The Sporting News Most Valuable Player Award (in each league) (discontinued in 1946)
Sporting News Player of the Year (in MLB; position players only)
List of Major League Baseball awards
Baseball awards

Notes
 A player is considered inactive if he has announced his retirement or has not played for a full season.
 A unanimous victory indicates that the player received all possible first-place votes.
 Torre is a member of the Hall of Fame, but not as a player.
 Hernandez and Stargell both received 216 points in the 1979 voting.

References

External links

Most Valuable Player MVP Awards & Cy Young Awards Winners (1911–present) (and "Multiple Winners of the MVP and Cy Young Awards"). Baseball-Reference.com. Retrieved 2016-11-07.

Major League Baseball most valuable player awards
Most Valuable Player Award
Major League Baseball
Major League Baseball
Awards established in 1931